The Zakhchin is a subgroup of the Oirats residing in Khovd Province, Mongolia.
Zakhchin means 'Border people'. They are so called because they originated from the border garrison (mainly from Torghut, Dorbet Oirat, and Dzungar) of the Dzungar Khanate. They originally spoke the Zakhchin dialect of the Oirat language, but actually pure Oirat language is used by elder generations, younger generations use a dialect being under a strong Khalkha influence.

History 
The Zakhchins conquered by the Manchus of the Qing dynasty in 1754 and controlled by Zasagt Khan aimag's Tsevdenjav gün, then moved to Zereg and Shar Khulsan. One Banner with 4(+1) sums were designated for them and noble Maamad (Mamuud) zaisan became the chieftain but Mamuud killed by Zungharian king Amarsanaa later and the Zakhchins revolted together with Amursana against the Qing.

The sums were:

 Bichgiin meeren's sum (in modern Mankhan, Khovd province)
 Güüj zan's sum (in modern Altai and part of Must, Khovd province)
 Baljinnyam zahiragch sum (in modern Zereg and parts of Mankhan in Khovd province)
 Jantsandorj's sum or Hoit (North) sum (in modern Mankhan, Khovd province)
 Guniikhen (in modern Uyench, Khovd province)

Administrative center was in Hoit sum's Tögrög Hüree.

During the Bogd Khanate of Mongolia, Zakhchin was subject to Dörbet Ünen Zorigt Khan aimag. The south Banner is called Goviinkhon "people of the Gobi", while the north was called the Shiliinkhen "people of the mountain range".

Clans 

Zakhchin has 16 tamga (seal) and 30 clans . Some of them are:

 Donjooniikhon
 Damjaaniikhan
 Shurdaankhan
 Baykhiinkhan
 Emchiinkhen
 Khereid
 Tsagaan Yas
 Aatiinkhan
 Dumiyenkhen
 Burd Tariachin
 Adsagiinkhan
 Tavagzaaniikhan
 Nokhoikhon
 Khotonguud
 Khurmshtiinkhan
 Mukhlainkhan

Number 
The Zakhchin numbered 29,800 in 2000.

Famous Zakhchins in modern Mongolia 
 Tsakhiagiin Elbegdorj, who is a former President of Mongolia 
 Damdingiin Demberel, who is current speaker of State Parliament
 Rinchinnyamyn Amarjargal, who is a former Prime Minister of Mongolia

References

Literature 
 [hamagmongol.narod.ru/library/khoyt_2008_r.htm Хойт С.К. Антропологические характеристики калмыков по данным исследователей XVIII-XIX вв. // Вестник Прикаспия: археология, история, этнография. No. 1. Элиста: Изд-во КГУ, 2008. с. 220–243.]
 [hamagmongol.narod.ru/library/khoyt_2012_r.htm Хойт С.К. Калмыки в работах антропологов первой половины XX вв. // Вестник Прикаспия: археология, история, этнография. No. 3, 2012. с. 215–245.]
Zakhchiny tüükh soël, öv ulamzhlal. Iadamzhav, ed. Ulaanbaatar : Soëmbo Printing KhKhK, 2014. 

Mongols
Mongol peoples
Ethnic groups in Mongolia
Oirats